Terry Deitz (born October 10, 1959) is an American retired U.S. Navy pilot, television host, and two-time contestant on the American reality television show Survivor, where he placed third in the 12th season. He also competed in the 31st season, placing 15th. He is currently a commercial airline pilot and host of Great Planes on the Military Channel.

Biography
Deitz was born and raised in Matawan, New Jersey. He was a student at St. John Vianney High School and also attended the United States Naval Academy, where he played Varsity Division I baseball. He graduated Annapolis in 1982.

Deitz served on the USS Carl Vinson with VF-51 flying the F-14 Tomcat and then served at the west coast Replacement Air Group as an instructor. He attended pilot school in Pensacola in 1984.  He left active service in 1992, and continued flying in the Navy Reserves with VR-52, on Logistics missions around the world. He retired in 2001 with the rank of Commander and is currently a pilot with American Airlines.

Deitz married his wife Trish in 1991. The couple have two children, Kayla and Daniel, and reside in Simsbury, Connecticut.

Deitz has been an athlete throughout his life and competed in baseball, basketball, football, swimming, and wrestling. He earned 11 varsity awards in high school and was named to the All State Baseball 1st Team. He was the quarterback of his high school team and led them to their first undefeated regular season and first state playoffs.  Also, his daughter Kayla was a lacrosse midfielder at San Diego State University.

Survivor

Panama
Deitz competed on Survivor: Panama — Exile Island in 2005. He was noted for dominating the challenges, with an unbroken string winning five immunity challenges and four reward challenges. He was also the first contestant to find a hidden immunity idol at Exile Island. However, because of his prowess in the immunity challenges, he never had to play it. Deitz finished in third place, behind Aras Baskauskas (winner) and Danielle DiLorenzo (runner-up).

With five consecutive immunity challenge wins, Deitz is currently tied with Colby Donaldson of Survivor: The Australian Outback for the record of the highest number of consecutive immunity challenge wins in Survivor history. He is also tied with Donaldson, Tom Westman, Ozzy Lusth, Mike Holloway, and Brad Culpepper for the record of most immunity challenge wins in a season overall. Also, with four additional reward challenge wins, Deitz is tied with Holloway for the record of the highest number of overall post-merge challenge wins in a single season. However, he is the only one of these five individuals to have never reached the finals.

After his appearance on Survivor: Panama, Deitz was considered one of the ten past castaways to return for the 16th season, Survivor: Micronesia, but was ultimately cut. He was also considered to return for the 27th season, Survivor: Blood vs. Water, where he would have competed alongside his daughter, but was cut from consideration since his daughter was then under the minimum age requirement.

Cambodia
On May 6, 2015, it was revealed that Deitz was one of the 16 men eligible to be voted in by viewers for Survivor's 31st season, Survivor: Cambodia. He was one of two representatives on the ballot from Panama, the other being Shane Powers. It was later revealed that Deitz and Powers had formed a pre-game alliance consisting of themselves, Jeff Varner (from Survivor: The Australian Outback) and Kelly Wiglesworth (from Survivor: Borneo). Although Powers did not make it onto the season, the other three members all were voted in and originally were placed on the same tribe, Ta Keo. After the tribal split on Day 7, from two tribes to three, Deitz was one of only two contestants who remained on the Ta Keo tribe, the other being Kelley Wentworth. On Day 10, Deitz won second place for his tribe in the "heroes duel" reward challenge. On Day 13, host Jeff Probst came to the Ta Keo camp in the middle of the night to inform Terry about his son Danny's heart condition, and Deitz immediately pulled himself from the game.

Other projects
On November 1, 2006, Deitz hosted The History Channel's Modern Marvels show on the final flight of the F-14 Tomcat.

In December 2007, Deitz was hired by Afterburner Seminars.  A team of 50 men and women fighter pilots who travel around the world working with Fortune 100 and Fortune 500 companies and other top organizations, teaching and preparing them for a fighter pilots view of Flawless Execution. As a main speaker for the group, he interacts with the leaders of these companies to mold presentations and programs.

In 2008, Deitz began work on a pilot combining "history with some elements of Survivor and Survivorman" with his cousin, former All My Children actor Mark La Mura.

In early 2012, Deitz took over from Maj. Paul "Max" Moga, when Deitz began hosting the third season of the TV series Great Planes on the Military Channel, ending each show with his personal tagline, "Your six is clear".

References

External links
Terry Deitz biography for Survivor: Panama at CBS.com

1959 births
Living people
Commercial aviators
People from Matawan, New Jersey
St. John Vianney High School (New Jersey) alumni
Survivor (American TV series) contestants
United States Naval Academy alumni
United States Naval Aviators
Military personnel from New Jersey